NGC 6709 is an open cluster of stars in the equatorial constellation of Aquila, some 5° to the southwest of the star Zeta Aquilae.

This cluster has a Trumpler class of IV 2 m, and is considered moderately rich with 305 member stars. It is around 141 million years old; about the same as the Pleiades. It contains two Be stars and one of them is a shell star. There is one candidate red giant member.

On the evening of November 13, 1984, David H. Levy discovered his first comet less than a degree from this cluster.

Gallery

References

External links
 
 
 webda

Open clusters
Aquila (constellation)
6709